Emperor Zhenzong of Song (23 December 968 – 23 March 1022), personal name Zhao Heng, was the third emperor of the Song dynasty of China. He reigned from 997 to his death in 1022. His personal name was originally Zhao Dechang, but was changed to Zhao Yuanxiu in 983, Zhao Yuankan in 986, and finally Zhao Heng in 995. He was the third son of his predecessor, Emperor Taizong, and was succeeded by his sixth son, Emperor Renzong at the end of his reign. From 1020 he was seriously ill, but retained power despite this. Because of his illness, day-to-day rule of China was often placed in the hands of his third wife, Empress Liu.

Reign 

Emperor Zhenzong's reign was noted for the consolidation of power and the strengthening of the Song Empire. The empire prospered, and its military might was further reinforced. However, it would also mark the beginning of a foreign policy towards the Khitan-led Liao dynasty in the north that would ultimately result in humiliation.

In 1004, the Khitans waged war against the Song Empire. Emperor Zhenzong, leading his army, struck back at the Khitans. Despite initial successes, in 1005, Emperor Zhenzong concluded the Chanyuan Treaty. The treaty resulted in over a century of peace, but at the price of the Song Empire agreeing to an inferior position to the Liao Empire, and also agreeing to pay an annual tribute of 100,000 ounces of silver and over 200,000 bolts of silk. The admission of inferiority would come to plague the foreign affairs of the Song Empire, while the payments slowly depleted the empire's coffers.

He was responsible for ordering the shipment of 30,000 bushels of quick-maturing rice seed from the Fujian Province to the lower Yangtze basin in 1011–1012, improving agriculture.

Emperor Zhenzong stressed the importance of Taoism at his imperial court. It was during his reign that the so-called Heavenly Texts, which glorified the Zhao family, were allegedly discovered. This was followed up by imperial sacrificial ceremonies carried out at Mount Tai. From 1013 to 1015, the emperor issued official decrees deifying the Jade Emperor as the highest ruler of Heaven.

Champa rice was introduced to China from Champa during Emperor Zhenzong's reign.

In 1020, Emperor Zhenzong became affected by an illness which was to cause his death two years later and unable to handle the affairs of state. By this time, Zhenzong’s wife Empress Liu was already established as power behind the throne and handled the affairs of state. She continued to act unofficially as regent of China for the two remaining years of Zhenzong’s life.

Zhenzong died in 1022 of his illness. He was succeeded by his 6th son, Zhao Zhen who took the throne as Emperor Renzong, but with actual power remaining in the hands of Empress Liu, who became empress dowager.

Archaeology
A number of Chinese artefacts dating from the Tang dynasty and Song dynasty, some of which had been owned by Emperor Zhenzong were excavated and then came into the hands of the Kuomintang general Ma Hongkui, who refused to publicise the findings. Among the artefacts were a white marble tablet from the Tang dynasty, gold nails, and bands made out of metal. It was not until after Ma died, that his wife went to Taiwan in 1971 from the United States to bring the artefacts to Chiang Kai-shek, who turned them over to the National Palace Museum.

Family
Consorts and Issue:
 Empress Zhanghuai, of the Pan clan (968–989)
 Empress Zhangmu, of the Guo clan (975–1007)
 Zhao You, Crown Prince Daoxian (995–1003), second son
 Unnamed son
 Unnamed son
 Empress Zhangxian, of the Liu clan (968–1033), personal name E
 Empress Zhangyi, of the Li clan (987–1032)
 Zhao Zhen, Renzong (1010–1063), sixth son
 Princess Jingyi, first daughter
 Empress Zhanghui, of the Yang clan (984–1036)
 Noble Consort Zhaojing, of the Shen clan (994–1076)
Worthy Consort, of the Cao clan (贤妃 曹氏)
Worthy Consort, of the Chen clan (贤妃 陈氏)
 Noble Consort, of the Du clan (d. 1046), personal name Qiongzhen
 Princess Zhaohuai (d. 1047), personal name Zhichong, second daughter
Lady of Conducive Appearance, of the Dai clan (順容戴氏)
Beauty, of the Xu clan (美人徐氏)
Talented Lady, of the Chen clan (才人陳氏)
 Unknown
 Zhao Ti, Prince Wen, first son
 Zhao Zhi, Prince Chang, third son
 Zhao Zhi, Prince Xin, fourth son
 Zhao Qi, Prince Qin, fifth son

Ancestry

References

 (With  the Empress Consort Liu)

968 births
1022 deaths
Northern Song emperors
11th-century Chinese monarchs
10th-century Chinese monarchs
People from Kaifeng
The Seven Heroes and Five Gallants characters